

This is a list of the National Register of Historic Places listings in Socorro County, New Mexico.

This is intended to be a complete list of the properties and districts on the National Register of Historic Places in Socorro County, New Mexico, United States. Latitude and longitude coordinates are provided for many National Register properties and districts; these locations may be seen together in a map.

There are 54 properties and districts listed on the National Register in the county, including 1 National Historic Landmark. Another property was once listed but has been removed. All of the places within the county on the National Register, except for one, are also listed on the State Register of Cultural Properties.

Current listings

|}

Former listing

|}

See also

 List of National Historic Landmarks in New Mexico
 National Register of Historic Places listings in New Mexico

References

Socorro